Dundalk Ice Dome was the first permanent ice arena in Ireland, located in Dundalk Retail Park, Dundalk, County Louth, Ireland. The Ice Dome aimed to become the centre of excellence for ice hockey in Ireland. It was home to the Irish national ice hockey squad and local team the Dundalk Bulls. For 2007 and 2008, the venue was used as a secondary venue by the Belfast Giants. The Ice Dome was closed in early May 2010 with plans to open under new management by Planet Ice; however, this has yet to happen and the rink remained closed.

Ice Hockey World Cup
In April 2007, Dundalk Ice Dome successfully staged the International Ice Hockey Federation Division III World Championships, where Team Ireland claimed a silver medal and promotion to Division II .

References

External links
Irish Ice Hockey Association
Dundalk Bulls

Buildings and structures in Dundalk
Indoor ice hockey venues in Ireland
Sport in Dundalk
Sports venues completed in 2006
Sports venues in County Louth
21st-century architecture in the Republic of Ireland